5-Bromouracil (5-BrU, 5BrUra, or br5Ura) is a brominated derivative of uracil that acts as an antimetabolite or base analog, substituting for thymine in DNA, and can induce DNA mutation in the same way as 2-aminopurine. It is used mainly as an experimental mutagen, but its deoxyriboside derivative (5-bromo-2-deoxy-uridine) is used to treat neoplasms.

5-BrU exists in three tautomeric forms that have different base pairing properties. The keto form (shown in the infobox) is complementary to adenine, so it can be incorporated into DNA by aligning opposite adenine residues during DNA replication (see below left). Alternatively, the enol (below right) and ion forms are complementary to guanine. This means that 5-BrU can be present in DNA either opposite adenine or guanine.

The three forms frequently interchange so base-pairing properties can become altered at any time. The result of this is that during a subsequent round of replication a different base is aligned opposite the 5-BrU residue. Further rounds of replication 'fix' the change by incorporating a normal nitrogen base into the complementary strand.

Thus 5-BrU induces a point mutation via base substitution. This base pair will change from an A-T to a G-C or from a G-C to an A-T after a number of replication cycles, depending on whether 5-BrU is within the DNA molecule or is an incoming base when it is enolized or ionized.

See also 
 5-Fluorouracil
 5-Chlorouracil

References

Nucleobases
Biomolecules
Organobromides
Pyrimidinediones